Saint-Georges-de-Mons is a commune in the Puy-de-Dôme department in Auvergne-Rhône-Alpes in central France.

See also
Communes of the Puy-de-Dôme department

References
 Town hall website 
 INSEE commune file

Saintgeorgesdemons